Abel Smith III (29 June 1748 – 22 January 1779) of Wilford House in the parish of Wilford, near Nottingham, England, was a British banker and politician who sat briefly in the House of Commons  from 1778 to 1779.

Origins
Smith was the second of the six sons of Abel Smith II (1717–1788), a Nottingham banker who, following his father Abel Smith I (1686–1756), had continued developing the business into what was by the end of the century to become one of the biggest private banks in England. Abel Smith I (the son of Thomas Smith (1631-1699) of Nottingham who founded Smith's Bank) had contented himself with using some of his wealth to intervene in other people's elections. 

His next younger brother was Robert Smith, 1st Baron Carrington, who followed him as an MP for Nottingham, and took over the business on his father's death and in 1796 he was raised to the peerage. Three of Abel Smith III's other younger brothers also became MPs.

Career
His father Abel Smith II entered Parliament for a pocket borough in 1774 and subsequently for two more, in Cornwall. Four years later, in October 1778, the young Abel Smith III could rely on the family's standing in his home city to secure election as a Member of Parliament for Nottingham; however, he died only three months later.

Marriage & issue
He married Elizabeth Uppleby, a daughter of Charles Uppleby of Wootton, by whom he had one daughter:
Mary Smith (d.1861), wife of John Sargent of Carlton Hall, Lindrick, Nottinghamshire.

References

1748 births
1779 deaths
Politicians from Nottingham
Abel
Members of the Parliament of Great Britain for English constituencies
British MPs 1774–1780